Limnochori may refer to the following places in Greece:

Limnochori, Achaea, a village in Achaea
Limnochori, Florina, a village in the Florina regional unit, part of the municipal unit Aetos
Limnochori, Serres, a village in the Serres regional unit, part of the municipality Irakleia